Qaplan II Giray, Qalpan Khan Girai II (1739–1771) was a Crimean khan of the late 18th century.

Biography 

Qaplan ruled from 1769 to 1770, a very brief reign. During his time as khan of the Crimean Khanate, he negotiated with the Russian Empire for Crimean independence. Qaplan fought against Russia in the Russo-Turkish War for his entire reign, and died in 1771.

References 
The Crimean Tatars, by Alan W. Fisher

Crimean Khans
1770 deaths
18th-century rulers in Europe
Year of birth unknown
People of the Russo-Turkish War (1768–1774)
1739 births